Inner Experience is a 1943 book by the French intellectual Georges Bataille. His first lengthy philosophical treatise, it was followed by Guilty (1944) and On Nietzsche (1945). Together, the three works constitute Bataille's Summa Atheologica, in which he explores the experience of excess, expressed in forms such as laughter, tears, eroticism, death, sacrifice and poetry.

Summary

Bataille discusses "inner experience", which he defines as states usually considered forms of mystical experience, including ecstasy and rapture.

Reception
Inner Experience received a negative reception from several authors due to having been published during the Second World War. Bataille was criticized for this privately by Jules Monnerot, and publicly by Patrick Waldberg. Boris Souvarine regarded its publication as a sign of Bataille's acceptance of the occupation of France. Bataille was attacked by surrealists in a pamphlet entitled Nom de Dieu. The surrealists considered Bataille an idealist. The philosopher Gabriel Marcel criticized the work from a Christian perspective.

References

Bibliography

 
 
 
 

1943 non-fiction books
Aesthetics books
Éditions Gallimard books
French non-fiction books
Works by Georges Bataille
fr:L'Expérience intérieure
it:L'esperienza interiore